Thulluru is a Village in Guntur district of Indian state of Andhra Pradesh. It is located at a distance of 4 km from Krishna River and was a village in Thulluru mandal of Guntur district, prior to its denotification as gram panchayat.

Demographics 

The average literacy rate stands at 69.44 percent, with  literates.

Transport 

Thulluru is located on Vijayawada and Amaravati route. The village is served by the APSRTC city bus services from Vijayawada bus station and Guntur Bus Station. Nowadays No of Buses Plying over Thullur to serve Secratariat.

Education
The primary and secondary school education is imparted by government, aided and private schools, under the School Education Department of the state. The medium of instruction followed by different schools are English, Telugu.

See also 
Thulluru mandal

References

External links 

Neighbourhoods in Amaravati
Mandal headquarters in Guntur district